Nicholas Andrew Cummings (July 25, 1924 – June 8, 2020) was an American psychologist and author.

Education
Cummings first attended the University of California at Berkeley, receiving a bachelor's degree in psychology, before moving to Claremont Graduate University for his master's and Adelphi University for a doctorate in clinical psychology.

Professional career 
Cummings was Chief of Mental Health with the Kaiser Permanente Health Maintenance Organization (1959–1979) and founding president of the California School of Professional Psychology (1970). He became instrumental in the development of the Psy.D. training program for clinical psychologists when he launched the National Foundation of Professional Schools of Psychology, an alternative to the American Psychological Association for accrediting university doctoral programs in clinical psychology. In 1979, Cummings was elected president of the American Psychological Association. In 1994, he co-founded with his wife the Nicholas & Dorothy Cummings Foundation. The Foundation is dedicated to ensuring that routine healthcare includes doctoral psychotherapy. In the 2010s, they donated $5 million to the Archives of the History of American Psychology at the University of Akron (Ohio), which renamed itself the Cummings Center for the History of Psychology as a result. Cummings and his daughter Janet L. Cummings founded the Cummings Graduate Institute for Behavioral Health Studies in 2014.

Select bibliography

Personal life
Cummings was born in Salinas, California. At the time of his death, Cummings resided in Reno, Nevada with his wife, Dorothy Mills Cummings. They have two children and two grandchildren.

References

1924 births
2020 deaths
Academics from California
Adelphi University alumni
American psychotherapists
Claremont Graduate University alumni
People from Salinas, California
Presidents of the American Psychological Association
University of California, Berkeley alumni